Zeus is a Greek god, the ruler of Mount Olympus and the king of the gods.

Zeus may also refer to:

Entertainment

Films
 Zeus Carver, a character in the 1995 American action film Die Hard with a Vengeance (played by Samuel L. Jackson)

Comics and manga
 Zeus (DC Comics), a portrayal of the god in the DC Comics universe
 Zeus (Marvel Comics), a portrayal of the god in the Marvel Comics universe
 Zeus the Great God, a shonen manga Saint Seiya
Zeus, is king of gods and one fighter in Record of Ragnarok

Video games
 Zeus: Master of Olympus, a computer game
 Zeus Kerauno, a game and anime portray in Kamigami no Asobi
 Lord Zeus (Kami-sama in JP), a support deities in Kid Icarus, Nintendo series
 Zeus, a video game character and antagonist in the God of War PlayStation series
 Zeus, a video game character and narrator in Ubisoft’s Immortals Fenyx Rising

Music
 Zeus (band), a Canadian indie rock band
 Zeus!, an Italian math rock band
 Zeus (EP), an EP by British Sea Power
 Zeus (musician), a rapper from Botswana
 Christopher "Zeuss" Harris, American record producer

Wrestling
 Zeus (American wrestler), American actor and former professional wrestler
 Zeus (Japanese wrestler), Japanese professional wrestler

Computing
 ZEUS (multi-agent system), an agent development toolkit
 Zeus (malware)
 Zeus Technology, a software company
 Zeus Web Server, a web server developed by Zeus Technology
 Zilog Enhanced Unix System, the operating system of a Zilog Z8000 based computer

Technology and transportation
 Zeus (particle detector)
 Spartan 8W Zeus, an American training aircraft
 BredaMenarinibus Zeus, an electric bus
 , a cargo ship launched in 1999 and renamed RMS Mulheim
 Zeus (roller coaster), a roller coaster at Mt. Olympus Theme Park
 ZEUS robotic surgical system, a medical robot
 ZEUS-HLONS (HMMWV Laser Ordnance Neutralization System), a laser weapon
 SAM-N-8 Zeus, a 1947 project for a guided anti-aircraft artillery shell
 Nickname of ZSU-23-4 Shilka, a Soviet anti-aircraft weapon system

Biology
 Zeus (fish), an animal genus in the family Zeidae
 Zeus (fungus), a fungus genus in the family Rhytismataceae
 Zeus (gene), a Drosophila male fertility gene
 ZEUS robotic surgical system, a medical robot

People 
 Ata Messan Ajavon Zeus, Togolese politician
 Johann Kaspar Zeuss, German historian and founder of Celtic philology
 Zeus B. Held, German music producer
 Zeus A. Salazar, Filipino historian, anthropologist, and philosopher of history
 Zeus (American wrestler), American actor and former professional wrestler
 Zeus (Japanese wrestler), Japanese professional wrestler
 Zeus (musician), a rapper from Botswana
 Christopher "Zeuss" Harris, American record producer
 Zamir White, American football player nicknamed "Zeus"

Other uses
 Zeus (dog), the world's tallest dog
 5731 Zeus, an Apollo asteroid
 Zeus, Virginia, an unincorporated community, United States

See also
 Zeeuws or Zeelandic, the dialect of Zeeland in the Netherlands
 Zea (disambiguation)
 Zoo (disambiguation)